Protium serratum is a small-medium tree species in the genus Protium and the family Burseraceae. The Catalogue of Life does not record any subspecies.

Its distribution is: Bhutan, China (Yunnan), Cambodia, India, Laos, Myanmar, Thailand and Vietnam.

References

External links
 
 

serratum
Flora of Indo-China
Flora of the Indian subcontinent
Flora of Yunnan